Events in the year 1947 in Portugal.

Incumbents
President: Óscar Carmona 
Prime Minister: António de Oliveira Salazar

Events
Establishment of the Fabrica Nacional de Municoes de Armas Ligeiras

Arts and entertainment
 3 June - Inauguration of the Cinema Batalha, in Porto

Sport
In association football, for the first-tier league seasons, see 1946–47 Primeira Divisão and 1947–48 Primeira Divisão; for the Taça de Portugal season, see 1947–48 Taça de Portugal. 
 10 August - Establishment of G.D. Sesimbra
 Establishment of C.D. Beja
 Establishment of O Elvas C.A.D.
 Establishment of S.C. Praiense
 World Fencing Championships, in Lisbon

Births
 9 February - José de Matos-Cruz, writer, journalist, editor, high-school teacher, investigator, encyclopedist
 15 August - Mário Barroso, film director, actor, cinematographer 
 16 November - Luís Filipe Rocha, film director, screenwriter, actor

References

 
Portugal
Years of the 20th century in Portugal
Portugal